Chromosome alignment-maintaining phosphoprotein 1 (CHAMP1) also known as zinc finger protein 828 (ZNF828) is a protein that in humans is encoded by the CHAMP1 gene.

References

External links

Further reading